Luigi Pezzuto (born 30 April 1946) is an Italian prelate of the Catholic Church who worked in the diplomatic service of the Holy See. He ended his career serving as the Apostolic Nuncio to Bosnia and Herzegovina and Montenegro from 17 November 2012 to 31 August 2021. He was made an archbishop in 1997 and led the diplomatic missions in several countries in Africa and Latin America between 1997 and 2012.

Biography
He was born in Squinzano, Italy. He was ordained a priest on 25 September 1971.

Pope John Paul II appointed him Titular Archbishop of Turris in Proconsulari and Apostolic Nuncio to the Republic of the Congo and to Gabon on 7 December 1996. He received his episcopal consecration on 6 January 1997.

He was named Nuncio to Tanzania on 22 May 1999.

On 2 April 2005 John Paul named him Nuncio to El Salvador
and on 7 May to Belize as well.

Pope Benedict XVI named him Nuncio to Bosnia-Herzegovina and to Montenegro on 17 November 2012.

He was named Apostolic Nuncio to Monaco as well on 16 January 2016. His term as nuncio there ended with the appointment of his successor on 25 May 2019.

Pope Francis accepted his resignation from his other positions on 31 August 2021.

See also
 List of heads of the diplomatic missions of the Holy See

References

External links

 Catholic Hierarchy: Archbishop Luigi Pezzuto 

1946 births
Living people
21st-century Italian Roman Catholic titular archbishops
20th-century Italian Roman Catholic titular archbishops
Apostolic Nuncios to Bosnia and Herzegovina
Apostolic Nuncios to Montenegro
Apostolic Nuncios to Belize
Apostolic Nuncios to El Salvador
Apostolic Nuncios to Gabon
Apostolic Nuncios to the Republic of the Congo
Apostolic Nuncios to Tanzania
People from the Province of Lecce